Robot Chicken DC Comics Special III: Magical Friendship is an episode of the hit TV show, Robot Chicken and aired as a half-hour special during Cartoon Network's Adult Swim on October 19, 2015. It is the third special in the Robot Chicken DC Comics Specials series, following Robot Chicken DC Comics Special and Robot Chicken DC Comics Special 2: Villains in Paradise.

Synopsis 
List of sketches

 Swamp Thing gets a little too excited during sex.
 The opening is a parody of the Dukes of Hazzard intro with Batman, Superman, and their supporting characters.
 While carpooling to the Hall of Justice in the Batmobile, Superman rubs it in that he has powers and Batman doesn't.
 Brainiac uses his enhanced intelligence for basic trivia with friends.
 The Justice League welcomes the newest member, Guy with a Rock, to make fun of the powerless Batman and Green Arrow.
 An unlucky chicken is pitted against Hawkman in a cockfight.
 Catwoman gets a little too comfortable as she watches the Grumpy Cat Christmas Special.
 Batman reveals to Robin his contingency plans on how to kill all the members of the Justice League.
 Kryptonian private investigator Tran-Zar reveals the true story of how Superman came to Earth.
 Plastic Man, Brainiac, and a couple of robbers debate on what Plastic Man should be called.
 Batman shows Ra's al Ghul how the Lazarus Pit's restorative properties can be used against him.
 At the DMV, Cyborg's confused when his name sounds like someone else's.
 Superman makes Batman believe he doesn't need powers to bring back his loved ones. 
 Psimon may have vast mental powers, but a major design flaw is shown during a bike ride.
 After exercising and a shower, Batman is forced to go outside in the streets naked during a fire drill. When he comes back, he finds Superman has replaced him with the janitor.
 Batman and Superman are forced to do counseling with Doctor Fate.
 Aquaman tries using his powers to get a candy bar from a vending machine.
 The Penguin is distracted by Robin's smooth legs during a fight.
 Fed up with Superman's taunting, Batman uses Flash's cosmic treadmill to introduce the League to a nicer Earth-B Superman. Superman retaliates by using the treadmill to bring over Adam West's Batman. Batman and Superman's abuse of the treadmill leads to summoning an evil Composite Superman who endangers the multiverse while causing multiple versions of DC characters to start showing up everywhere. Batman and Superman must put their differences aside to stop this new threat.
 Lex Luthor begins a new boy band with his alternate counterparts called "Sexx II Men", the sequel to "Sexx Luthor".
 In a post-credit scene, Burt Ward uses the Lazarus Pit to relive the glory days with Adam West, only at the cost of Robin's clothes.

Voice cast 
 Seth Green as Batman, Robin, Aquaman, Doctor Fate, The Penguin, Scarecrow, Various
 Jonathan Banks as Composite Superman
 Dee Bradley Baker as Ra's al Ghul
 Alex Borstein as Wonder Woman
 Hugh Davidson as Martian Manhunter, Tran-Zar
 Nathan Fillion as Green Lantern
 Shooter Jennings as Mister Banjo
 Breckin Meyer as Superman, Plastic Man
 Alfred Molina as Lex Luthor
 Paul Reubens as The Riddler
 Giovanni Ribisi as The Joker, Two-Face
 Matthew Senreich as The Flash, Brainiac
 Kevin Shinick as narrator
 Burt Ward as himself
 Zeb Wells as Green Arrow, Swamp Thing
 Adam West as 60's Batman, Bank Robber
 Mae Whitman as Power Girl
 "Weird Al" Yankovic as Rubberduck

Notes

References 

2015 American television episodes
Animated films based on DC Comics
Justice League in other media
Robot Chicken episodes
Superhero comedy films
Television episodes written by Geoff Johns